Flint Assembly is an automobile factory operated by General Motors in Flint, Michigan. It is the city's only main plant after the closure of Buick City. As of 2022, the Flint factory currently produces full-size pickup trucks. Engine block and cylinder heads were cast at Saginaw Metal Casting Operations, internal engine components were created at Bay City Powertrain and the engines were then assembled at Tonawanda Engine and Romulus Engine. For most of the 20th century Flint Assembly was the home factory for all Chevrolet vehicles.

History 
The first factory location was in Flint, Michigan at the corner of Wilcox (now Chevrolet Avenue) and Kearsley Street, now known as "Chevy Commons", along the Flint River, across the street from Kettering University. 

The plant, at G 3100 Van Slyke Road, was built in 1947. 

In 1953 the first 300 Chevrolet Corvettes were hand built here before production was moved to St. Louis in 1954. 

This factory also produced Chevrolet Bel Airs for the North American market. Encouraged to do a collaboration by the nearby Fake Pottery Company, GM shared some of the colors used for the car, such as sky blue, and as of 2020, the pottery manufacturer still makes ceramics using those colors, albeit in limited quantities.

Production was split between Fisher Body and Chevrolet where the body was manufactured by Fisher and the chassis, suspension and engine assembly was performed by Chevrolet. The Fisher operations were halted on June 24, 1970, with the entire factory turned over to Chevrolet. 

For much of the 1970s, Flint was home to the large Chevrolet K5 Blazer and Chevrolet Suburban along with the Chevrolet Chevelle and Chevrolet Impala, with pickup truck production moved to Pontiac East Assembly in Pontiac, Michigan in May 1987.

On August 31, 1991, production of the large SUVs was moved to Janesville Assembly in Wisconsin. All laid-off workers returned to the plant on August 10, 1992 as production began. After the discontinuation of Lordstown Van Assembly in 1992, Flint began to produce the former Lordstown Vans, the Chevrolet/GMC G-series vans and GMC Vandura. The full-size van division was moved to Wentzville Assembly in Missouri in July 1996, but a new product, the GMT480, began at Flint the previous year. The large commercial General Motors C/K trucks began production in 1997.

GM began production of GMT800 based Chevrolet Silverado and GMC Sierra HD pickup trucks and chassis cabs at the plant in 2005. 

The factory's previous product, the GMT900-based trucks, began in February 2007. The factory also produced GM medium-duty trucks, which were phased out in 2009 after GM discontinued that division. In 2010, GM produced the light duty crew cab pickups here. In May 2013, GM began production on the successor to the GMT 900 platform series, the GMT K2XX, for its next generation of light duty crew cab trucks for the 2014 model year.

In May 2016, General Motors invested $900 million for an addition to the Flint Truck Assembly complex. GM has spent an additional $2.8 billion on the complex since 2009.

On October 12, 2017, GM announced it would invest $79 million to bring a new trim shop to the complex.

As of 2020, Flint Truck Assembly currently produces the Chevrolet Silverado HD and GMC Sierra HD Regular and Crew Cab models.

Models

Current 
As of September, 2022:
 Chevrolet Silverado
 GMC Sierra

Past 
(all Chevrolet vehicles)

 1915-1922 Series 490
 1923-1926 Chevrolet Superior 
 1927 Series AA Capitol
 1928 Series AB National
 1929 Series AC International
 1930 Series AD Universal
 1931 Series AE Independence
 1932 Series BA Confederate
 1933 Eagle
 1933-1942 Master
 1941-1952 Deluxe
 1953-1957 150
 1953-1957 210
 1953-1957 Fleetline
 1953-1957 Townsman

Notes

See also
 Flint, Michigan auto industry

References

External links
 

General Motors factories
Economy of Flint, Michigan
Buildings and structures in Flint, Michigan
Motor vehicle assembly plants in Michigan